Anne Louise Dudek (born March 22, 1975) is an American actress. She is known for portraying Tiffany Wilson in the 2004 film White Chicks, Danielle Brooks in the USA Network television series Covert Affairs, Dr. Amber Volakis on the Fox series House, Lura Grant on the HBO series Big Love, and Francine Hanson on the AMC series Mad Men. She has also starred in the British television series The Book Group.

Early life
Dudek was born in Boston, Massachusetts, and grew up in Newton, Massachusetts. Her father was an architect. She graduated from Newton North High School and attended Northwestern University.

Career
From the mid-1990s (while at Northwestern University) through 2001, Dudek appeared in various theater productions and on Broadway. She made her Broadway debut in Wrong Mountain in 2000. She won the Connecticut Critics Circle Award for outstanding performance in The Glass Menagerie.

After success on Broadway, she made the jump to television. Her first starring role on television came when she was cast as the lead in the British comedy drama The Book Group. The show aired on Channel 4 in the United Kingdom to rave reviews. In her native United States, Dudek has since guest starred on other TV shows, including Desperate Housewives (as Karl Mayer's girlfriend in Season 1), How I Met Your Mother (as 'Nathalie', Ted's Krav Maga-trained ex-girlfriend), Friends (as 'Precious', Mike Hannigan's girlfriend), ER (as a mother who accidentally shot her son), Charmed, Bones (as Seeley Booth's lawyer girlfriend), Numb3rs, and Six Feet Under. She also played Lucinda Barry in the pilot episode of Psych, and a teacher who has a sexual relationship with one of her students (based on the case of Debra Lafave) on Law & Order: Criminal Intent. In both Friends and How I Met Your Mother, her character was dumped on her birthday.  Dudek appeared in several episodes of the HBO series Big Love as a child bride.

Dudek had a role on House (recurring from season 4 onwards) as Amber Volakis, one of 40 physicians under consideration by Dr. House for permanent positions on his team. Her character, nicknamed "Cutthroat Bitch" by House, continued to the end of season 4 but was killed off in the two-part season finale, "House's Head" and "Wilson's Heart".  She would later reappear as a hallucination by House in the season 5 episode "Saviors", appearing in this form for the remainder of the season.

Dudek later appeared in Mad Men as next-door neighbor Francine Hanson, and on Big Love as one of antagonist Alby Grant's wives, both recurring roles. In 2010, she joined the cast of Covert Affairs.  She played Anthony Hopkins' character's daughter in the 2003 film The Human Stain, and cruise line heir Tiffany Wilson in the 2004 comedy film White Chicks. In 2012, she played an ISS astronaut in one episode of the TV show Touch. She also reprised her role as Amber Volakis for the House series finale "Everybody Dies".

In 2015, Dudek played villainess Dawn Lin in an episode of NCIS: New Orleans, and also made a guest appearance in the fifth-season finale of Rizzoli & Isles.
In 2017, she recurred on The Flash as Tracy Brand.

Personal life
Dudek married artist Matthew Dana Heller in 2008. They have a son, Akiva, who was born on December 14, 2008, and a daughter, Saskia, who was born in February 2012. The couple divorced in 2016.

Filmography

Film

Television

References

External links 

 
 

1975 births
20th-century American actresses
21st-century American actresses
Actresses from Boston
American film actresses
American people of Polish descent
American television actresses
Living people
Northwestern University School of Communication alumni
Newton North High School alumni